Players born on or after 1 January 1986 were eligible to participate in the tournament. Players' age as of 18 July 2005 – the tournament's opening day. Players in bold have later been capped at full international level.

Group A

Head coach:  Uli Stielike

Head coach:  Nikos Nioplias

Head coach:  Mal Donaghy

Head coach:  Zvonko Živković

Group B

Head coach:  Samvel Petrosyan

Head coach:  Martin Hunter

Head coach:  Jean Gallice

Head coach:  Tor Ole Skullerund

Footnotes

Squads
UEFA European Under-19 Championship squads